Charles Ferris may refer to:

 Charles G. Ferris (1796–1848), U.S. Representative from New York
 Charles D. Ferris (born 1931), Chairman of the Federal Communications Commission